Two Little Imps is a 1917 American silent comedy film directed by Kenean Buel and starring Jane Lee, Katherine Lee and Leslie Austin.

Cast
 Jane Lee as Jane 
 Katherine Lee as Katherine 
 Leslie Austin as Billy Parke 
 Edna Hunter as Betty Murray 
 Edwin Holt as William Murray 
 Stuart Sage as Bob Murray 
 Sidney D'Albrook as Burglar 
 William Harvey as His Pal

References

External links
 

1917 films
1917 drama films
American silent feature films
American drama films
American black-and-white films
Films directed by Kenean Buel
Fox Film films
1910s English-language films
1910s American films
Silent American drama films